Théodore-Octave Girardet (22 September 1861, Versailles - 29 January 1935, Sainte-Maxime) was a French illustrator and woodcut artist.

Life and work
He came from a Swiss Huguenot family. His father, Paul Girardet, was a copper engraver. His brothers, Jules, Eugène, Paul Armand and Léon, as well as his sister, Julia Antonine (1851-1921), also became painters or engravers.

He studied painting at the École Nationale Supérieure des Beaux-Arts in Paris with Alexandre Cabanel.

He remained in Paris, where he specialized in woodcut illustrations for newspapers and magazines, such as Le Monde illustré, L'Illustration and Le Tour du Monde; often based on designs by his brother-in-law, Eugène Burnand, or other family members. He was also active in the advertising industry, which was very lucrative, and held an occasional exhibition at the Salon.

Sources 
 M.Tripet: "Girardet, Théodore-Octave". In: Carl Brun (Ed.): Schweizerisches Künstler-Lexikon, Vol.1: A–G. Huber & Co., Frauenfeld 1905, pg.586 (Online)
 "Girardet, Théodore". In: Ulrich Thieme, Fred. C. Willis (Ed.): Allgemeines Lexikon der Bildenden Künstler von der Antike bis zur Gegenwart, Vol.14: Giddens–Gress. E. A. Seemann, Leipzig 1921, pg.168 (Online)
 René Burnand: L’étonnante histoire des Girardet. Artistes suisses. La Baconnière, Neuchâtel 1940.
 René Burnand: Les Girardet au Locle et dans le monde. La Baconnière, Neuchâtel 1957.

External links 
 
 

1861 births
1935 deaths
French artists
Woodcut cutters
Woodcut designers
French illustrators
People from Versailles